Hello Hum is the fifth album by Canadian indie rock band Wintersleep, released on June 12, 2012.

The band started writing the album during the New Inheritors tour in 2010 and 2011, via "late 
night voice memo'd bedroom demos, hallucinogenic dreams of Paul Schaeffer".

The group recorded the new songs in the late summer of 2011 with Scottish producer Tony Doogan, who had already produced their last effort New Inheritors, and Dave Fridmann, who had previously worked with such bands as The Flaming Lips, Mercury Rev, and MGMT.

Track listing

Notes
  Some iTunes stores lists it as Bonus Track Version, due to having (selected ones) Deluxe Edition of album with the bonus track titled Papa Time.

Credits
 Michael Bigelow – Composer
 Greg Calbi – Mastering
 Loel Campbell – Composer, Group Member
 Marianne Collins – Illustrations
 Tim D'Eon – Composer, Group Member
 Tony Doogan – Engineer, Producer
 Dave Fridmann – Additional Music, Bass, Mixing, Producer
 Jud Haynes – Design, Layout
 Jon Samuel – Composer
 Paul Murphy - Composer, Group Member
 Wintersleep – Primary Artist

References

2012 albums
Wintersleep albums
Albums produced by Tony Doogan
Albums recorded at Tarbox Road Studios